The Colfox Baronetcy, of Symondsbury in the County of Dorset, is a title in the Baronetage of the United Kingdom. It was created on 4 July 1939 for the Conservative politician Philip Colfox. He was succeeded by his younger and only surviving son, the second Baronet, who was a Deputy Lieutenant of Dorset in 1977. Following the second baronet's death in 2014, the title was then held by his elder son.

Colfox baronets, of Symondsbury (1939)
Sir (William) Philip Colfox, 1st Baronet (1888–1966)
Sir (William) John Colfox, 2nd Baronet (1924–2014)
Sir Philip John Colfox, 3rd Baronet (born 1962)

The Heir Apparent to the baronetcy is John Alfred Colfox (born 2000), only son of the 3rd Baronet.

References

Kidd, Charles, Williamson, David (editors). Debrett's Peerage and Baronetage (1990 edition). New York: St Martin's Press, 1990, 

Colfox